Club Atlético de Madrid Juvenil are the under-19 team of Spanish professional football club Atlético Madrid. 
They play in the Group V of the División de Honor Juvenil de Fútbol where their main rivals are Real Madrid and Rayo Vallecano. 

They also participate in the national Copa de Campeones Juvenil and the Copa del Rey Juvenil, qualification for which is dependent on final league group position, and have taken part in the continental UEFA Youth League.

Juvenil A 
.

Season to season (Juvenil A)

Superliga / Liga de Honor sub-19
Seasons with two or more trophies shown in bold

División de Honor Juvenil
Seasons with two or more trophies shown in bold
{| class="wikitable" style="text-align:center; font-size:90%"
|-
! *Season* !! Level !! Group !! Position !! Copa del Rey Juv. !! Copa de Campeones !! Europe/notes
|-
| 1995–96 || bgcolor=#FFFF00|1 || 5 || 12th || N/A || N/A || rowspan="16" 
|-
| 1996–97 || bgcolor=#FFFF00|1 || 5 || bgcolor=silver|2nd || Round of 16 || N/A
|-
| 1997–98 || bgcolor=#FFFF00|1 || 5 || 9th || N/A || N/A
|-
| 1998–99 || bgcolor=#FFFF00|1 || 5 || 8th || N/A || N/A
|-
| 1999–00 || bgcolor=#FFFF00|1 || 5 || bgcolor=silver|2nd || Semi-final || N/A
|-
| 2000–01 || bgcolor=#FFFF00|1 || 5 || bgcolor=gold|1st || Round of 16 || bgcolor=silver|Runners-up
|-
| 2001–02 || bgcolor=#FFFF00|1 || 5 || bgcolor=gold| 1st  || Quarter-final || bgcolor=gold|Winners 
|-
| 2002–03 || bgcolor=#FFFF00|1 || 5 || bgcolor=gold|1st || Round of 16 || 3rd in group of 3
|-
| 2003–04 || bgcolor=#FFFF00|1 || 5 || 5th || N/A || N/A
|-
| 2004–05 || bgcolor=#FFFF00|1 || 5 || bgcolor=gold|1st || Round of 16 || 3rd in group of 3
|-
| 2005–06 || bgcolor=#FFFF00|1 || 5 || 4th || N/A || N/A
|-
| 2006–07 || bgcolor=#FFFF00|1 || 5 || bgcolor=#D2B48C|3rd || N/A || N/A
|-
| 2007–08 || bgcolor=#FFFF00|1 || 5 || bgcolor=#D2B48C|3rd || N/A || N/A
|-
| 2008–09 || bgcolor=#FFFF00|1 || 5 || bgcolor=gold|1st || Round of 16 || Quarter-final
|-
| 2009–10 || bgcolor=#FFFF00|1 || 5 || bgcolor=silver|2nd || Quarter-final || N/A
|-
| 2010–11 || bgcolor=#FFFF00|1 || 5 || 9th || N/A || N/A
|-
| 2011–12 || bgcolor=#FFFF00|1 || 5 || bgcolor=gold|1st || Semi-final || Semi-final || N/A
|-
| 2012–13 || bgcolor=#FFFF00|1 || 5 || bgcolor=silver|2nd || Semi-final || Quarter-final || N/A
|-
| 2013–14 || bgcolor=#FFFF00|1 || V || bgcolor=silver|2nd || Round of 16 || N/A || 1st in group, Round of 16
|-
| 2014–15 || bgcolor=#FFFF00|1 || V || 4th || N/A || N/A || 1st in group, Quarter-final
|-
| 2015–16 || bgcolor=#FFFF00|1 || V || bgcolor=gold|1st || bgcolor=gold|Winners  || Quarter-final || 2nd in group, Play-off round
|-
| 2016–17 || bgcolor=#FFFF00|1 || V || bgcolor=silver|2nd || bgcolor=silver|Runners-up || Quarter-final || 2nd in group, Quarter-final
|-
| 2017–18 || bgcolor=#FFFF00|1 || V || bgcolor=gold|1st || bgcolor=gold|Winners || bgcolor=gold|Winners || 2nd in group, Quarter-final
|-
| 2018–19 || bgcolor=#FFFF00|1 || V || bgcolor=gold|1st || bgcolor=silver|Runners-up || Quarter-final || 1st in group, Round of 16
|-
| 2019–20 || bgcolor=#FFFF00|1 || V || bgcolor=silver|2nd || N/A || N/A || 2nd in group, Round of 16
|-
| 2020–21 || bgcolor=#FFFF00|1 || V || bgcolor=gold|1st || N/A || Quarter-final || N/A
|}

 Honours National competitions'''
 División de Honor: 10
2001, 2002, 2003, 2005, 2009, 2012, 2016, 2018, 2019, 2021
 Copa de Campeones: 2
2002, 2018
 Copa del Rey: 5
1952, 1956, 1958, 2016, 2018

UEFA Youth League

Current squad 
.

Juvenil B 
.

See also
Atlético Madrid B
Atlético Madrid C

References

Juvenil A
Football academies in Spain
División de Honor Juvenil de Fútbol
UEFA Youth League teams